Yangquan North railway station is a railway station on the Shitai Passenger Railway, in Yangquan, Shanxi Province, People's Republic of China.

The station is situated some distance away from downtown Yangquan. Yangquan North was expanded with the opening of the Yangquan–Dazhai railway on 24 September 2020, which provides a link to the new Yangquan East railway station, just north of the urban area.

References 

Railway stations in Shanxi
Stations on the Qingdao–Taiyuan High-Speed Railway